Sir William George Maxwell   (9 June 1871 – 22 August 1959) was a British colonial administrator in British Malaya and the Straits Settlements.

Biography
He was the eldest son of Sir William Edward Maxwell and Lilias Grant Mackay.

Sir George entered the service of the Perak Government as a junior officer in 1891. He then progressed to Assistant District Magistrate and Registrar of Courts in Kinta Valley (Perak). He was also the Assistant Secretary to the Government of Perak, Acting Collector of Land Revenue in Larut, Registrar of Titles and Warden of Mines in Northern Perak and Acting Senior Magistrate for Selangor, Negeri Sembilan, and Perak. In 1904, he was transferred to the Civil Service of Straits Settlements and was Acting Commissioner of the Court of Requests in Singapore.

He was posted as the District Officer of Dinding, Perak, Solicitor General (1906). On 9 July 1909 the Bangkok Agreement, which was ratified by the British and Siamese, made Kedah part of the British Empire and he was then appointed British Adviser to Kedah (1909–1915) and (1918–1919). He was also the British Resident of Perak (1919–1920) and Chief Secretary of Federated Malay States (1920–1926).

Marriage
Sir William George Maxwell married his cousin Florence Evelyn daughter of Walter F Stevenson on 28 August 1902 in St. Mary's Church, Hendon, Middlesex.

Contributions and honours
To remember his contributions in Perak, Maxwell Hill in Taiping was named after him.

On 29 November 1929, he opened the Sultan Idris Training College in Perak and making it the highest institution of learning exclusively for the Malays at that time. To remember his contributions in education SMK Maxwell (Maxwell School) in Kuala Lumpur was named after him.

He was invested with Companion of the Order of St Michael and St George (CMG) in 1915 and  Knight Commander of the Order of the British Empire (KBE) in 1924.

Sources and references 

WorldStatesmen – Malaysia
Maxwell family tree

1871 births
1959 deaths
Knights Commander of the Order of the British Empire
Companions of the Order of St Michael and St George
History of Perak
Administrators in British Malaya